Sharaf al-Din or Shihab al-Din or Muḥyi al-Din Abu al-Abbas Aḥmad ibn Ali ibn Yusuf al-Qurashi al-Sufi, better known as Ahmad al-Buni, born in Buna, in present-day Annaba, Algeria, died 1225, was a mathematician and philosopher and a well known Sufi and writer on the esoteric value of letters and topics relating to mathematics, sihr (sorcery) and spirituality, but very little is known about him. Al-Buni lived in Egypt and learned from many eminent Sufi masters of his time.

A contemporary of Ibn Arabi, he is best known for writing one of the most important books of his era; the Shams al-Ma'arif, a book that is still regarded as the foremost occult text on talismans and divination.

Contributions

Theurgy 
Instead of sihr (Sorcery), this kind of magic was called Ilm al-Hikmah (Knowledge of the Wisdom), Ilm al-simiyah (Study of the Divine Names) and Ruhaniyat (Spirituality). Most of the so-called mujarrabât ("time-tested methods") books on sorcery in the Muslim world are simplified excerpts from the Shams al-ma`ârif. The book remains the seminal work on Theurgy and esoteric arts to this day.

Mathematics and science 
In c. 1200, Ahmad al-Buni showed how to construct magic squares using a simple bordering technique, but he may not have discovered the method himself. Al-Buni wrote about Latin squares and constructed, for example, 4 x 4 Latin squares using letters from one of the 99 names of Allah. His works on traditional healing remains a point of reference among Yoruba Muslim healers in Nigeria and other areas of the Muslim world.

Influence
His work is said to have influenced the Hurufis and the New Lettrist International.

Denis MacEoin in a 1985 article in Studia Iranica said that Al-Buni may also have indirectly influenced the late Shi'i movement of Babism. MacEoin said that Babis made widespread use of talismans and magical letters.

Writings

 Shams al-Maʿārif al-Kubrā (The Great Sun of Gnosis), Cairo, 1928.
 Sharḥ Ism Allāh al-aʿẓam fī al-rūḥānī, printed in 1357 AH or in Egypt al-Maṭbaʿa al-Maḥmudiyya al-Tujjariyya bi'l-Azhar.
 Kabs al-iktidā, Oriental Manuscripts in Durham University Library.
 Berhatiah, Ancient Magick Conjuration Of Power.
 Treatise on the Magical Uses of the Ninety-nine Names of God in the Khalili Collection of Islamic Art

References

Notes
 Edgar W. Francis, Mapping the Boundaries between Magic. The Names of God in the Writings of Ahmad ibn Ali al-Buni

External links

 Shams al-Ma'arif al-Kubra - شمس المعارف ولطائف العوارف
 Kabs al-iktida - قبس الإقتداء

1225 deaths
13th-century Algerian people
13th-century Arabs
Magic squares
Medieval Egyptian mathematicians
Buni
Sufi writers
Year of birth unknown
People from Annaba
People from the Almohad Caliphate